KRVU-LD (channel 21) is a low-power television station in Redding, California, United States, affiliated with MyNetworkTV. It is owned by Sinclair Broadcast Group alongside ABC affiliate KRCR-TV (channel 7, also licensed to Redding) and three other low-power stations: Chico-licensed Antenna TV affiliate KXVU-LD (channel 17); Chico-licensed Univision affiliate KUCO-LD (channel 27); and Chico-licensed UniMás affiliate KKTF-LD (channel 30). Sinclair also provides certain services to Paradise-licensed Fox affiliate KCVU (channel 20) through a local marketing agreement (LMA) with Cunningham Broadcasting; however, Sinclair effectively owns KCVU as the majority of Cunningham's stock is owned by the family of deceased group founder Julian Smith. The stations share studios on Auditorium Drive east of downtown Redding and maintain a news bureau and sales office at the former Sainte Television Group facilities on Main Street in downtown Chico (for FCC and other legal purposes, the Chico/Paradise-licensed stations still use the Chico address and Redding-licensed stations use the Redding address). KRVU-LD's transmitter is located near Shasta, California.

History
KRVU/KZVU was founded by Sainte Partners II, L.P., owned by country-western singer Chester Smith and hit the air in 1993, seven years after the founding of KCVU (KZVU-LD was originally K21DS from 1993 to 1997 and KZVU-LP from 1997 to 2009). It became an affiliate of the fledgling new UPN network in 1997 and would change affiliations to MyNetworkTV following the creation of The CW in 2006. Smith remained owner until his death in 2008.

Merger with Eureka Television Group
On April 27, 2009, KRVU/KZVU merged its operations with sister station KEMY in Eureka, California, and both stations were rebranded "Northern California's My TV".

Sale to Bonten Media Group
KRVU and its sister stations were sold to Bonten Media Group in 2012.  (The flagship station of Sainte, KCVU FOX 20, was sold to Esteem Broadcasting, but is operated by Bonten.)

The station was formerly known as MyTV Northern California, but reverted to its original call letters upon the station's purchase in 2012.

Sale to Sinclair
On April 21, 2017, Sinclair Broadcast Group announced its intent to purchase the Bonten stations (including KRVU-LD) for $240 million. The deal came immediately following the re-instatement of the "UHF discount", which reduces the calculated "reach" of a station for the purposes of national ownership limits if it broadcasts on a UHF channel. The sale was completed September 1.

Programming

Local programming

The Moriss Taylor Show (1997–2015)
KRVU began airing reruns of The Moriss Taylor Show, claimed to be the longest-running locally produced television program in television history, in 1997 after the show's parent station KHSL-TV cancelled it following that station's purchase by Catamount Broadcasting.  Shows from the late 1980s through 1995, produced and taped at the KHSL-TV studios, aired on Saturday mornings at 10:00am on My 21, but was cancelled by new owners Bonten Media Group a few years after their purchase of the station in 2015.  Reasoning for the cancellation was that the show had been produced by KHSL-TV and Bonten's (now Sinclair's) ownership of KRCR prevents ANY programs from the rival competitor to air.

The show also aired Saturday afternoons at 1:30pm on sister station KFBI-LD My 48 in Medford before being replaced by Celebrate Jesus with Arbee Freeman.

Taylor and fellow Oklahoman Chester Smith had similar paths and backgrounds, thus it was a natural choice to air Taylor's program in reruns on Smith's station.

So You Want To Be A Star (2005)
KRVU debuted a new local version of American Idol called So You Want To Be A Star, hosted by actress/singer Linda Regan, in 2005.  The show was an instant smash with Redding resident Kim Walker winning the competition and getting a chance to sing "The Star-Spangled Banner" at a Sacramento Kings game at ARCO Arena in February 2005.  She was interviewed by Kings broadcaster Jim Kozimor during halftime for the UPN 21 audience only.  However, commentators Grant Napear and Jerry Reynolds plugged the show and the station during the broadcast which also aired on KXTV in Sacramento.  A second season of So You Want To Be A Star was planned, but the primary sponsors backed out and the project was abandoned. (Sister station KCVU holds a local contest called "Northern California Idol", where the winner gets a bid to audition for American Idol, thus was the inspiration for the series).

Technical information

Subchannels 
The station's digital signal is multiplexed:

Early switch
KCVU, along with KHSL-TV and KNVN ceased analog operations on December 22, 2008. KCVU ceased analog operations early because the post-transition tower is complete and has been up and running for at least seven months; same case with KHSL. In the case of KBVU and its sister stations, the transition for some was much later as KUCO-LP, KXVU-LP, KKTF-LD, and both KBVU and MyTV's analog translators remained analog through late 2009/early 2010 when the Sainte Television Group ended all of its analog operations.

KVIQ and KBVU already made the switch on November 28, 2008.

References

External links
 MyTV Northern California's website
 Fox 20's website
 

MyNetworkTV affiliates
RVU-LD
Low-power television stations in the United States
Sinclair Broadcast Group